Vincent Cheng Kim Chuan (钟金全) is a Singaporean Catholic social worker who was detained under the Internal Security Act during the 1987 Operation Spectrum for three years.

Controversy
In 1987, Cheng was one of the 22 Singaporeans branded as a "Marxist conspirator" and arrested under Operation Spectrum. He was the last detainee to be released.

On 1 January 1994, Amnesty International recognised him as a "prisoner of conscience."

Cheng and his fellow detainees related some of their experiences, including physical torture, in the book, That We May Dream Again, published in 2009.

Cheng has also recounted on his experiences in the blog Singaporerebel. The NGO Singaporeans For Democracy (SFD) wrote an official letter of inquiry to the Internal Security Department over the issue.

Notes

External links
Vincent Cheng speaks at a Singapore Democratic Party (SDP) rally (video): Part 1,Part 2
 "Vincent Cheng: What I did for Wah Piow" June 10, 1987

Amnesty International prisoners of conscience held by Singapore
Dissidents
Singaporean people of Chinese descent
Singaporean Roman Catholics
Living people
Singaporean prisoners and detainees
Year of birth missing (living people)